Melychiopharis is a genus of South American orb-weaver spiders first described by Eugène Simon in 1895.  it contains only two species, both found in Brazil.

References

Araneidae
Araneomorphae genera
Spiders of Brazil
Taxa named by Eugène Simon